Papaya Global is a privately held software company based in Herzliya, Israel. It supplies payroll and payments for companies hiring international employees through their organizations EOR and contractors.

History
Papaya Global was founded in April 2016 by Eynat Guez (CEO), Ofer Herman (SVP IT&IS), and Ruben Drong (SVP Data). In October 2018, the company raised $3 million in seed money
and in November 2019, $45 million in a series A round led by Insight Partners, with the participation of Bessemer Venture Partners. 
 
In September 2020, the company raised $40 million in a series B round. It was led by Scale Venture Partners, along with other VC's such as Access Industries , and existing investors, including Insight Partners and Bessemer Venture Partners. 

In March 2021, the company raised $100 million in a Series C round led by GreenOaks Capital Partners and existing investors, making the total amount raised $195 million, and bringing its value to $1.2 billion, becoming a Unicorn
In September 2021, Papaya Global raised $250 million in a Series D round led by Insight Partners, bringing its value to $3.7 billion. The total amount raised by the company is $440 million. 
The company has offices in New York City, Austin, Melbourne, Singapore, Kraków, London and Herzliya.

In July 2020, it acquired the intellectual property of Mensch, Human resource management system company.
In November 2021, the company acquired NickNack, an Israeli telework connectivity startup.
In March 2022, it acquired Azimo, remittance payments  service.
The company has more than 700 customers including Panasonic, Shopify, Payoneer, Vimeo, Intel, Toyota, Wix.com, Microsoft, Fiverr, CyberArk, Checkmarx,
OneTrust, Hopin, nCino, General Dynamics,
and Johnson & Johnson.

Products 
Papaya Global provides SaaS services for workforce management, organizational socialization, payroll and compliance and payments of transnational  organizations. The system provides software as a service model in over 160 states and handles payroll and payments employees, EOR and contractors.
It offers workforce compliance facility with employment laws and regulations in each country, including the creation of contracts in accordance with local labor laws and filing local tax forms. The company offers immigration services to accommodate work permit for employees, for short or long period assignments outside their home countries. It assists businesses with delivering payments for their workers within 72 hours. It integrates with JPMorgan Chase processing payments.
The payroll UI uses features that support businesses in understanding and analyzing their payroll information.

Awards and recognition
Papaya Global has been listed as a promising start-up or a prominent company  by Business Insider,
Dun & Bradstreet,
Wired
Inc.,
TechRepublic,

Visa Inc.,
Deloitte and Gartner,
In Israel by Calcalist in  2018,

2019 
and 2020;
and Globes.
It was chosen by Forbes as one of the 100 cloud companies in 2021  
and 2022,   
 
and is included in CNBC list of top 25 enterprise startups powering the economy in 2022

and as one of the 10 most innovative companies in EMEA in 2023 by Fast Company.

See also
List of unicorn startup companies
Science and technology in Israel
Silicon Wadi

References

Financial services companies established in 2016
Software companies of Israel
Privately held companies of Israel
Payroll
Payment service providers
Information technology companies of Israel
Companies based in Herzliya

he:פאפאיה גלובל